Heliophorus androcles, the green sapphire, is a small butterfly found in India (mainly the part of NE India) and Nepal that belongs to the lycaenids or blues family.

See also
List of butterflies of India
List of butterflies of India (Lycaenidae)

References
 
 

Heliophorus
Butterflies of Asia
Butterflies described in 1851